Roberto Requião de Mello e Silva (born March 5, 1941) is a Brazilian politician and journalist. He has represented Paraná in the Federal Senate two times, between 1995 and 2002 and from 2011 to 2019. Previously, he was governor of Paraná from 2003 to 2010. He was a member of the Brazilian Democratic Movement Party from 1980 to 2022, when he decided to leave the party to join the Workers' Party in order to run in the 2022 Paraná gubernatorial election.

References

Living people
1941 births
Members of the Federal Senate (Brazil)
Brazilian Democratic Movement politicians
Governors of Paraná (state)
Mayors of Curitiba